"If I Could Teach the World" is a hip-hop single released in 1997 by Bone Thugs-n-Harmony. It appeared on their album The Art of War and reached number 20 on the U.S. Hot 100. The group also won an AMA for best hip-hop artist for this song.

Music video
Bizzy Bone appears in the song but not the video, while Flesh-n-Bone appears in the video but not the song. The video shows the group in the Apocalypse and at war.  The instrumental of the song Thug Luv is played at the beginning and end of the video.

Charts

Certifications

References

1997 singles
Bone Thugs-n-Harmony songs
1997 songs
Ruthless Records singles
Songs written by DJ U-Neek
Songs written by Layzie Bone
Songs written by Bizzy Bone
Songs written by Wish Bone
Songs written by Krayzie Bone